Murrells Inlet Historic District is a national historic district located at Murrells Inlet, Georgetown County, South Carolina. The district encompasses 37 contributing buildings and contains a significant concentration of buildings that visually reflect the transition of the area from adjoining estates of two 19th-century rice planters into a 20th-century resort community. The district contains two antebellum houses, which are local interpretations of the Greek Revival style and a collection of early-20th-century vernacular resort buildings. Residential in character, the historic district contains approximately 19 houses. Although they exhibit some diversity, the prevalent use of wood as a building material, the large screened porches, and the setting of moss-draped trees, marshland, and piers provide a visual unity.

It was listed on the National Register of Historic Places in 1980.

References

Historic districts on the National Register of Historic Places in South Carolina
Houses on the National Register of Historic Places in South Carolina
Greek Revival houses in South Carolina
National Register of Historic Places in Georgetown County, South Carolina
Houses in Georgetown County, South Carolina